Ravinder Kumar (born 1991) is an Indian serial killer, rapist, child molester, and necrophile who committed the abduction, rape, and murder of a minimum of fifteen children between 2008 and 2015. He was apprehended on 19 July 2015, and confessed to murdering thirty children in total. He targeted the children of poor families in Delhi, Mundka, Samaypur, Badli, Begampur and Vijay Vihar and confessed to killing more than 30. His victims were primarily aged 4–6 years old. Police were able to link him with 15 of his confessed crimes. His crimes commenced with the rape and murder of a labourer’s child from Samaypur Badli in 2008. Some media reports mention accomplices in some of Kumar's crimes.

See also
List of serial killers by country
List of serial killers by number of victims

References 

1991 births
Indian murderers of children
Indian people convicted of child sexual abuse
Indian people convicted of murder
Indian serial killers
Living people
Male serial killers
Necrophiles
People from Budaun
Indian people convicted of rape
Criminals from Uttar Pradesh
Murder in Delhi
Criminals from Haryana